The 2012 Baghdad police academy bombing occurred on 19 February 2012 when a suicide bomber targeted police recruits in Baghdad, Iraq, killing 19 and injuring 26 others. The police academy, located in the northeastern part of the city near the Interior Ministry building is a fortified compound with security barriers. As a crowd of police officers and recruits stepped out onto the road, a suicide bomber driving a car rigged with explosives careered into them, causing an explosion. It was the deadliest attack in Iraq since 27 January when a suicide bomber targeted a hospital in Baghdad, killing 31.
2 al Qaida homicide bombers also attacked the Baghdad Police College on 6 December 2005, murdering 47 police cadets and officers and sending another 85 to area hospitals.

See also
 5 January 2012 Iraq bombings
 23 July 2012 Iraq attacks
 2003 Jordanian embassy bombing in Baghdad
 30 September 2004 Baghdad bombing

References

2012 murders in Iraq
21st-century mass murder in Iraq
Terrorist incidents in Iraq in 2012
Islamic terrorist incidents in 2012
Car and truck bombings in Iraq
Bombings in the Iraqi insurgency
Mass murder in 2012
Suicide bombings in Baghdad
2010s in Baghdad
February 2012 events in Iraq
School bombings in Asia
Building bombings in Iraq
University and college killings in Asia
February 2012 crimes